The Mosher House, is a Frank Lloyd Wright designed Prairie School home that was constructed in Wellington, Ohio in 1902.

References

Further reading

External links
 * 
 
 

Frank Lloyd Wright buildings
Houses in Lorain County, Ohio
National Register of Historic Places in Lorain County, Ohio